Surapong Thammawongsa (Thai สุรพงษ์ ธรรมวงศา) is a Thai retired professional footballer.

Honours
Southeast Asian Games: 2001 with Thailand U23 
Thai Premier League: 2006 with Bangkok University 
Thailand Division 1 League: 2008 with Muangthong United

External links
Profile at Thaipremierleague.co.th

Living people
Surapong Thammawongsa
1980 births
Association football midfielders
Surapong Thammawongsa
Surapong Thammawongsa
Surapong Thammawongsa
Surapong Thammawongsa
Surapong Thammawongsa